Cephaloplatus is a genus of shield bugs in the tribe Carpocorini.

Species 
 Cephaloplatus (Cephaloplatus) australis Dallas, 1851
 Cephaloplatus (Cephaloplatus) bellus Gross, 1970
 Cephaloplatus (Cephaloplatus) clementi Distant, 1910
 Cephaloplatus (Cephaloplatus) darwini Distant, 1910
 Cephaloplatus (Cephaloplatus) elegans McDonald, 1992
 Cephaloplatus (Cephaloplatus) explanatus Gross, 1970
 Cephaloplatus (Cephaloplatus) fasciatus Distant, 1881 
 Cephaloplatus (Cephaloplatus) granulatus Bergroth, 1895
 Cephaloplatus (Cephaloplatus) minchami Gross, 1976
 Cephaloplatus (Cephaloplatus) nubifer Bergroth, 1916 
 Cephaloplatus (Cephaloplatus) pallipes Walker, 1868
 Cephaloplatus (Cephaloplatus) pellewensis Gross, 1970
 Cephaloplatus (Cephaloplatus) pertyi (White, 1842)
 Cephaloplatus (Cephaloplatus) reticulatus Bergroth, 1895
 Cephaloplatus (Cephaloplatus) spurcatus Walker, 1867
 Cephaloplatus (Dolichoplatus) elongatus Distant, 1899
 Cephaloplatus (Melanoplatus) minor Distant, 1910

References 

 Gross, G.F. 1970, "A revision of the Australian pentatomid bugs of the genus Cephaloplatus White (Hemiptera: Pentatomidae: Pentatominae)", Records of the South Australian Museum (Adelaide), volume 16, pages 1–58

External links 

 
 Cephaloplatus at Atlas of Living Australia

Pentatomidae
Pentatomomorpha genera